Archelaus (Ἀrkhélaos; reigned from c. 790 to c. 760 BC) was the 7th Agiad dynasty king of Sparta. He was a son of Agesilaus I. Together with Charilaus, he conquered Elis. During his reign he also conquered the city of Aegys and sold the inhabitants into slavery. He was succeeded by king Teleclus.

8th-century BC rulers
8th-century BC Spartans
Agiad kings of Sparta